Peter Steinwender (2 November 1928 – 19 November 2011) was an Austrian swimmer. He competed in the men's 400 metre freestyle at the 1952 Summer Olympics.

References

External links
 

1928 births
2011 deaths
Olympic swimmers of Austria
Swimmers at the 1952 Summer Olympics
Place of birth missing
Austrian male freestyle swimmers